Hestia Tobacco is an American tobacco company, founded in 2010. It was known as the producer of filtered little cigars using all-natural tobacco, until releasing all-natural cigarettes in November 2022.  It is one of the first American Tobacco companies to be started in more than twenty years, in part because of regulatory difficulties with the FDA.

Branding 
The name comes from the Greek goddess of the hearth. Hestia cigarette boxes are bright orange with a “Lichenstein-like design” on the front and literary quotes from the likes of Hemingway and O’Hara are printed on the back.

References 

Tobacco companies of the United States
Cigar brands
Tobacco brands